Asymmetrarcha is a genus of moths belonging to the subfamily Olethreutinae of the family Tortricidae.

Species
Asymmetrarcha iograpta (Meyrick, 1907)
Asymmetrarcha metallicana Kuznetsov, 1992
Asymmetrarcha thaiensis Kawabe, 1989
Asymmetrarcha torquens Diakonoff, 1973
Asymmetrarcha xenopa Diakonoff, 1973

See also
List of Tortricidae genera

References

External links
tortricidae.com

Tortricidae genera
Gatesclarkeanini
Taxa named by Alexey Diakonoff